Asleesp in the Deep may refer to:
 Asleep in the Deep (Dad's Army), an episode of the British sitcom Dad's Army
 "Asleep in the Deep" (song), by Henry W. Petrie and Arthur J. Lamb
 "Asleep in the Deep", a song by progressive metal band Mastodon from the album Once More 'Round the Sun
 Asleep in the Deep, a 1925 American comedy short film directed by Arvid E. Gillstrom.